The 1932–33 season was the 56th Scottish football season in which Dumbarton competed at national level, entering the Scottish Football League and the Scottish Cup.  In addition Dumbarton competed in the Dumbartonshire Cup.

Scottish League 

Dumbarton 11th successive season in the Second Division saw an improvement in performances as they climbed back into the top half of the league by finishing 9th out of 18, with 34 points – 20 behind champions Hibernian.  The improvement could have been greater as there is no doubt that the campaign was handicapped by Dumbarton's inability to register a single win away from Boghead.

Scottish Cup

Dumbarton reached the second round before losing out to Albion Rovers.

Dumbartonshire Cup
Dumbarton retained the Dumbartonshire Cup, beating Vale Ocaba in the final.

Friendlies

Player statistics

|}

Source:

International Caps
Johnny Parlane earned his first cap playing for Scotland Amateur against Ireland on 28 January 1933.

Transfers

Players in

Players out 

In addition George Hodge, Norman Shaw and John Thomson all played their last games in Dumbarton 'colours'.

Source:

References

Dumbarton F.C. seasons
Scottish football clubs 1932–33 season